Adhamh Ó Cianáin (died 1373) was an Irish historian and genealogist.

Described in his obituary as "a learned historian" and "a canon" of Lisgoole, "having secured victory of deamon and world".

A member of the Ó Cianáin learned family of Fermanagh, Adhamh studied under Seán Mór Ó Dubhagáin; it was from the latter's book that Adhamh wrote Leabhar Adhamh Ó Cianain ('The Book of Adhamh Ó Cianáin') according to a colophon, whilst another states "Adhamh O Cianan ro sgribh in leabhar sa do fen/Adhamh Ó Cianáin wrote this book for himself".

He and Ó Dubhagáin had the responsibility of recording the genealogies of Irish Kings of the mid-Fourteenth Century.

References

Augustinian canons
Irish genealogists
Irish book and manuscript collectors
14th-century Irish historians
Medieval European scribes
Irish scribes
Irish-language writers
People from County Fermanagh
1373 deaths
Year of birth unknown